This is a list of museums in Hungary.

 Aquincum Museum
 Budapest Museum Quarter
 Christian Museum (Hungary)
 Egri Road Beatles Múzeum
 Ethnographic Museum (Budapest)
 Ferenc Hopp Museum Of Asiatic Arts (Budapest)
 Gasmuseum (Budapest)
 Geological Museum (Budapest)
 Greek Orthodox Church and Museum, Miskolc
 House of Terror
 Hungarian Geographical Museum (Érd)
 Hungarian National Gallery
 Hungarian National Museum
 Hungarian Natural History Museum
 Hungarian Railway Museum
 Koller Gallery
 Kunsthalle Budapest
 Memento Park
 Museum of Applied Arts (Budapest)
 Museum of Fine Arts (Budapest)
 Museum of Hungarian Aviation
 Museum of Hungarian Military History
 Museum of Minerals in Siófok
 Ópusztaszer National Heritage Park
 Ottó Herman Museum
 Palace of Arts (Budapest)
 Széchenyi Mansion
 Transport Museum of Budapest
 Vajdahunyad Castle
 Waxworks museum of the Castle of Diósgyőr
 Zelnik István Southeast Asian Gold Museum

See also 

 List of museums
 Tourism in Hungary
 Culture of Hungary

Museums
 
Hungary
Museums
Museums
Hungary